Chakkarpur is a big village in Gurugram city of Haryana, India. It is located in Sector-28 of Gurugram on Mehrauli Gurugram Road, Haryana. It has a population of about 10000 people living in around 4,589 households.

The village started its journey in 1800s, when four brothers from village Luni, now Nashibpur in Narnaul , Mahendargarh district of Haryana had reached the group of huts, they had to dig a well and built huts. Those four brothers will later form villages Chakkarpur, Sarhaul, Mulehera and Dundahera. All of them share the same caste ‘Yadav’ and same sub caste (gotra) ‘Nuniwal’.  They began agriculture in the surrounding free lands. The people of the village did extreme hard work to put the barren land to use. The Chakkarpur Village has 3 oldest havelis (old household structures) dating back to 1800s which eventually segregate the people of village in 3 sections (patti) which are namely Tehai, Saraoji and Dhapa.

The village is known for its unity in nearby villages. Village Chakkarpur situated in Ward No. 33 of Gurgaon Nagar Nigam and Sectors 27, 28, 42, 43, Dlf phase-1 and Dlf phase-4 and Initial Golf Course Road is built on the land acquired from the Village. The original inhabitants of the village are Ahirs or Yadavs and often called Raosahab. Primary occupations of the households were farming and dairy production and distribution. Several youth from the past have duly served the nation in World War 1, World War 2 and has even been part of the Azad Hind Fauj led by Subhash Chandra Bose. Subedar Deegram Yadav(Tehai) and many others were sent to Singapore for war on the event of WW2 and returned nearly after 7 years. 
The village had the most number of Government Employees in nearby villages at a point of time.
Life was tough as to make a living, one had to do Job as well as Farming. 
By the 2000s, people from other several states like West Bengal, Bihar, Rajasthan and Uttar Pradesh shifted here for its well known P.G accommodation as Gurugram was seeing massive growth. 
Chakkarpur’s households generate the highest rental income amongst the urban villages and the rural villages. 
The Deputy Mayor of Gurugram Sh.Sunita Yadav is also from Chakkarpur. The village is located close to M.G road metro station and resides condominiums like Sahara Grace, Silverglades, Laburnum, Essel Towers, Heritage City, Hamilton Court, MLA Flats, Ridgewood Apartments and even resides malls like Sahara Mall, MGF Metropolitan Mall, PVR Mega Mall, DLF Grand Mall, PVR City Centre Mall, Vipul Agora Mall, JMD Empire Mall, Global Foyer Mall in its Territory.

References 

Best Holi Status Collection In Hindi

Villages in Gurgaon district